The Kremlin Ring (transliteration: Kremlovskoye Koltso), is the ring road that runs around the Moscow Kremlin along a line that largely coincides with the borders of Kitay-gorod.

Term
Since 1992, the name “Kremlin Ring” has been given to the first route of the Five Rings of Moscow cycling race. In the official documents of the Government of Moscow, this term, as a designation of a highway, began to appear no later than the first half of the 2000s. The publicist Aleksander Toroptsev wrote in 2007: "... not a single map of Moscow, not a single textbook on Moscow studies has such a historical and geographical term - the Kremlin Ring, although the ring itself exists, and it has a history, and geography, and cultural values, and architectural masterpieces, and, moreover, there is a certain, if I may say so, urban unity of the Kremlin Ring". The term began to be actively used in the second half of the 2010s, during the implementation of the My Street program. The term also appeared on the official scheme of night bus routes in Moscow.

In the 1997 book "Moscow: An Architectural Guide" instead of the term "Kremlin Ring", the name "Semiring of Central Squares" is used.

References

Ring roads in Moscow
Transport in Moscow